The Michelin Pilot Challenge is a grand touring and touring car racing series run by the International Motor Sports Association. Originating from the Canadian Motorola Cup, the series was taken over by Grand-Am in 2001 to become the Grand-Am Cup following the demise of rival IMSA's Firehawk series of similar rules in the US. KONI became series sponsor for the start of the 2007 season when the series became known as the KONI Challenge Series, before renaming once more prior to the start of the 2009 season as the KONI Sports Car Challenge. The series name was once again changed for the 2010 season to Continental Tire Sports Car Challenge. In 2019, the series rebranded again after Michelin was selected to become the new official tire supplier of the series.

The Continental Challenge was the support series for Grand-Am's premier offering, the Rolex Sports Car Series. In 2014, the series became the support series for the United SportsCar Championship (now known as the IMSA SportsCar Championship) upon the merger of the Rolex Series and the American Le Mans Series.

Races
In traditional sports car racing format, the races are often run with both GS and ST classes on track simultaneously, which is known as a "combined" race. Occasionally the races will be run in "split classes", with separate races for both classes. This is especially common for shorter venues such as Lime Rock Park. Currently the races are 2 hours 30 minutes in length with a required driver change.

Telecasts
All telecasts are exclusive to Fox Sports 1, formerly Speed Channel. All telecasts are uploaded to the series website after their initial airing.
From 2019 season, NBC Sports telecast Delayed-Race and IMSA TV has telecast live via website.
In 2022, the Michelin Pilot Challenge is included in NASCAR's media rights deals in Mexico and Brazil that includes NASCAR's three national series, IMSA's two major series, and American Flat Track, all of which have broadcasts produced by NASCAR.

Vehicles
The series uses two classes in each race. Originally, these were:

The Grand Sport (GS) class features large-displacement 6-cylinder, 8-cylinder, 10-cylinder or 12-cylinder sports cars as well as small displacement 4-cylinder forced induction sports cars.
The Street Tuner (ST) class is for smaller 4-cylinder, 5-cylinder or 6-cylinder sedans, hatchbacks, coupes or convertibles.

From 2017, IMSA allowed cars built by "mainstream automotive manufacturers" to SRO GT4 regulations to compete, with a complete phase out of the original Grand-Am GS class the next year. Also in 2018, IMSA introduced TCR Touring Cars as a third class, with the intention of it replacing the Street Tuners as the second class, which happened the following year.

The original format was reminiscent of the original Trans-Am Series, combining conventional sports cars and touring cars, though the Trans-Am Series usually had a single driver per car, unlike the Continental Challenge, which has two drivers per car. Some vehicles in the Continental Challenge have actually been wrapped to resemble the original Trans Am cars, such as the Boss 302 Mustangs of George Follmer and Parnelli Jones or the original Sunoco Camaro.  As the Pilot Challenge consists of longer races (2-4 hours), the cars are also eligible for the United States Auto Club's Pirelli World Challenge GT4 or TCR classes, which are one-hour races.

Champions

Notes

References

External links

 
International Motor Sports Association
Auto racing series in the United States
Auto racing series in Canada
Touring car racing series
Grand-Am
GT4 (sports car class)